Harry Caples (1898–1933) was an Australian representative rugby league player. His club football was played with the Eastern Suburbs club.

Club career

A former schoolboy star, Caples attended St. Joseph's College, Hunters Hill before being graded by the Roosters in 1916.

He played 110 matches for the club in the years (1916-23 & 1929). A five-eighth, Caples captained Easts to the club's fourth premiership in 1923, scoring two tries in that match.

Representative career

Caples was selected for the 1921–22 Kangaroo tour of Great Britain. He played for Australia in two Tests on tour and 22 minor tour matches. He is listed on the Australian Players Register as Kangaroo No. 117. During his career he represented for three different states New South Wales, Queensland and Victoria.

Interstate service to the game

After his premiership success in 1923, Harry Caples moved to Victoria in 1924 at the direction of ARL executive Harry Sunderland to help organize Rugby League in the southern states. Sydney's Evening News newspaper quoted: "Mr Sunderland is making strong efforts to place the game on a solid footing in Melbourne, and he has approached several noted players to go south and give their services." 

Sunderland (who was Queensland based), then sent him to Ipswich, Queensland in 1925 and he played there for a number of years. Caples captain-coached Wagga Wagga in 1928, before returning to Easts for one last season in 1929.

Premature death

Caples died after contracting Meningitis at the relatively young age of 35. A large funeral was held for him at the Sacred Heart Church, Randwick and he was buried at Randwick Cemetery. He was survived by his wife Dorothy and three young children.

References

Sources 
 Whiticker, Alan & Collis, Ian (2006) The History of Rugby League Clubs, New Holland, Sydney
 Andrews, Malcolm (2006) The ABC of Rugby League Austn Broadcasting Corpn, Sydney
 Queensland representatives at qrl.com.au

1898 births
People educated at St Joseph's College, Hunters Hill
Australian rugby league players
Sydney Roosters players
Sydney Roosters captains
Australia national rugby league team players
Queensland rugby league team players
1933 deaths
Australasia rugby league team players
Rugby league five-eighths
Date of birth missing